O'Donnell House may refer to:

Ireland
 O'Donnell House (Ireland), All Hallows College, Drumcondra

United States

 Miller–O'Donnell House, Mobile, Alabama
 Thomas O'Donnell House, Palm Springs, California, listed on the National Register of Historic Places (NRHP) in Riverside County
 Fobes-O'Donnell House, Oakham, Massachusetts
 I.D. O'Donnell House, Billings, Montana, listed on the NRHP in Yellowstone County
 E. J. O'Donnell House, near Portland, Oregon, NRHP-listed
 O'Donnell House (Sumter, South Carolina), NRHP-listed
 Patrick O'Donnell House, Charleston, South Carolina

See also
 O'Donnell (disambiguation)